Giselle Jeanne-Marie Laronde-West (born October 23, 1963) is a Trinidadian model and beauty queen who won the  Miss World 1986 contest, representing Trinidad and Tobago. She became the second woman from that nation to win an international beauty pageant, after Janelle Commissiong Miss Universe 1977.  The pageant was held in London, UK.  In that year, the US was represented by aspiring actress Halle Berry.

Early life
Giselle was born in Port-of-Spain, Trinidad. She grew up all over Trinidad but spent most of her life in San Fernando where she moved with her family at the age of 10.  One of four children, she attended St. Peter's school at Pointe-à-Pierre and St. Francois Girls High School. In her early 20s, while Giselle was working at a local credit union, many of her friends and family encouraged her to enter the Miss World contest because they said she looked the part and had the personality. Giselle believed herself to be good-looking, but did not believe herself to be exceptionally gorgeous. She also considered herself a "tom-boy"; "never glamorous, never ever a girly-girl or getting her nails and hair done..." Family therefore had to prod, they encourage her to attend the Miss World auditions held in the nation's capital, Port-of-Spain, which was the last day to be eligible for the contest. When she did win the Miss World title she was surprised, more like shocked, she was full of pride and excitement and had little fear of what winning would mean for her life. Laronde think the most important factors that led her to winning were a combination of self-assurance, confidence, beauty, personality, intellect, grace, and presence. Giselle was told by one of the judges that she looked at ease on the stage and flowed when she walked.

After Miss World
After winning the Miss World title she used her prize money to attend the Goldsmiths College, University of London where she completed a degree in Sociology and Communication. Laronde-West was awarded the Chaconia Medal and had a BWIA plane named after her. She holds a third degree black belt in Shotokan karate with SKIF, and won several medals at world championships around the world. She is married to Heathcliff West and has two sons, Kye and Kristof, who previously attended Fatima College and then her son Kristof West got accepted to Li Po Chun United World College from where he graduated in 2019. She continues to live in her homeland of Trinidad and Tobago where she is the Hospitality and Communications Manager with Angostura Ltd.

References

1963 births
Living people
Miss World winners
Miss World 1986 delegates
Trinidad and Tobago female models
Trinidad and Tobago beauty pageant winners
Trinidad and Tobago expatriates in England
Recipients of the Chaconia Medal
Alumni of Goldsmiths, University of London